Pichavaram is a village near Chidambaram in Cuddalore District, Tamil Nadu, India. It is located between the Vellar estuary in the north and Coleroon estuary in the south. The Vellar-Coleroon estuarine complex forms the Killai backwater and the mangroves that are permanently rooted in a few feet of water. It is located at the distance of 243 km from Chennai and 15 km from Chidambaram.

Mangrove forests
Pichavaram consists of a number of islands interspersing a vast expanse of water covered with mangrove forest. The Pichavaram mangrove Forest is one of the largest mangrove forests in India covering about 45 sq km of area (as of 2019). It is separated from the Bay of Bengal by a sand bar. The biotope consists of species like Avicennia and Rhizophora. It also supports the existence of rare varieties of economically important shells and fishes.

Fauna
The mangroves also attract migrant and local birds including snipes, cormorants, egrets, storks, herons, spoonbills and pelicans. About 177 species of birds belonging to 15 orders and 41 families have been recorded. High population of birds could be seen from November to January due to high availability of prey, coincidence of the time of arrival of true migrants from foreign countries and local migrants from their breeding grounds across India. The availability of different habitat types such as channels, creeks, gullies, mudflats and sand flats and adjacent seashore offers ideal habitat for different species of birds and animals.

Gallery

References

External links

 Cuddalore District - Pichavaram Dawn fest

Forests of India
Ramsar sites in India